Frederick James Koenekamp, A.S.C. (November 11, 1922 – May 31, 2017) was an American cinematographer. He was the son of cinematographer Hans F. Koenekamp.

Koenekamp worked in television and feature films from the 1960s, earning two Primetime Emmy Awards for his work on The Man from U.N.C.L.E.  He was nominated for an Oscar for Patton (1970) and Islands in the Stream (1977) and won the Oscar for The Towering Inferno (1974), along with Joseph Biroc. Other films shot by Koenekamp include Papillon (1973), Fun with Dick and Jane (1977), The Swarm (1978) and The Adventures of Buckaroo Banzai Across the 8th Dimension (1984). He was a frequent collaborator of director Franklin J. Schaffner.

Early life and education 
Fred J. Koenekamp was the son of American cinematographer H. F. Koenekamp, ASC. Hans was the cameraman of Mack Sennett and his career worked with the likes of Charlie Chaplin, Gloria Swanson and the Keystone Cops. Hans would later receive the ASC Presidents Award in 1991. On occasion, as a young boy, Fred would go with his father on the weekends to visit the studios which he worked in. He took particular interest in the Camera and Special Effects Department at Warner Bros.

Despite this background in film, Koenekamp developed a much greater interest in aviation and enrolled in the commercial aviation program at the University of Southern California. When World War II broke out, Koenekamp enlisted in the Navy and served in the South Pacific for three and a half years. Koenekamp would resume his education after the end of the war.

Career 
At the age of 23, Fred received a phone call from Herb Aller, head of the cameraman's union, and was offered a job as a film loader at RKO Pictures. It was during this time in which Fred developed a fascination with the picture business.

During this time, Bill Ellington, head of the camera department at RKO, and Ted Winchester, an associate at RKO, began to mentor Fred and during their spare time in the loading rooms, would teach Fred how to operate and take care of cameras.

The first five years of Koenekemp's career were fairly tumultuous and Fred found himself unemployed and employed again on several occasions. In 1953, Koenekamp received an offer from Bill Ellington to return to RKO to work on several 3D film setups and tests. As business began to pick up at RKO once again, Koenekamp received his first job as an assistant cameraman on Underwater!  starring Jane Russell and directed by John Sturges. Koenekamp found himself in Hawaii for seven weeks and developed a skill for underwater photography.

As a result of his experience with underwater photography, Koenekamp found himself at MGM working as an assistant cameraman on a project with Esther Williams. This would initiate Koenekamp's 14-year stint at MGM.

After five years working as an assistant cameraman at MGM, Koenekamp became an operator. His first film as an operator was The Brothers Karamazov, a film adapted and directed by Richard Brooks. Moving from assistant cameraman to operator, Koenekamp described the increase in responsibilities as a daunting task. It was during this time in which Koenekamp learned how to light scenes, compose shots, and work with a director. At MGM, Fred developed close working relations with Robert Surtees, ASC and Milton Krasner, ASC. Koenekamp worked with Surtees as a technician on Raintree County, the first film shot with Panavision 70.

Koenekamp became an operator for Gunsmoke as business began to slow down at MGM. When the series wrapped, Fred found himself a four-year stint working on The Man from U.N.C.L.E. and earned himself two Emmy nominations for his work on the 1964–65 and 1965–66 seasons. Koenekamp would receive his first credit as a cinematographer for 1966's The Spy with My Face, a big screen adaptation of The Man from U.N.C.L.E. Within the next three years, Koenekamp worked on four more features with MGM—Doctor, You've Got to Be Kidding!, with Sandra Dee and George Hamilton; Stay Away, Joe (1968) and Live a Little, Love a Little, and Heaven with a Gun, with Glenn Ford. Koenekamp would then move on to work with Warner Bros. on The Great Bank Robbery.

In the midst of working on The Great Bank Robbery, Koenekamp received a call from his agent regarding interviewing with director Franklin J. Schaffner for Patton (1970). A week later, Frank received a call informing him that he was selected to be the cinematographer for the film. Patton shot in several locations including England, Greece, North Africa and Spain, and while shooting, Koenekamp developed a very close working relation with Franklin J. Schaffner. It was for Patton which Koenekamp received his first Academy Award for Best Cinematography nomination.

Koenekamp worked with Fox and director John Guillermin for 1974 action-drama disaster film The Towering Inferno. Fred worked with cinematographer Joseph Biroc on the film, and the two would win their first Academy Award for Best Cinematography. Koenekamp and Biroc would go on to work on four more features together.

Koenekamp reunited with Franklin J. Schaffner to work on Islands in the Stream and received his third Academy award nomination.

Legacy 
Koenekamp retired at the age of 67 as a result of his displeasure with the quality of the films he was working on. His last film was Flight of the Intruder (1991).

Throughout his career as a cinematographer, Koenekamp preferred to work with the same crew. He had three assistants—Mike Benson, Ed Morey and Chuck Arnold, all of which he eventually made operators. All three would eventually become cinematographers as well.

Koenkamp was honored with an ASC Award for Outstanding Achievement on February 20, 2004.

Koenekamp died, at the age of 94, on May 31, 2017, and was buried at Eternal Valley Memorial Park in Santa Clarita, California.

Filmography

Films

Television

Awards and nominations

Nominated 

 The Man from U.N.C.L.E. (1964–67)
 Primetime Emmy Award for Outstanding Individual Achievements in Entertainment - Cinematography
 Primetime Emmy Award for Individual Achievement in Cinematography
 Patton (1970)
 Academy Award for Best Cinematography
 The Towering Inferno (1974)
 BAFTA Award for Best Cinematography
 Islands in the Stream (1977)
 Academy Award for Best Cinematography

Won 

 Patton (1970)
 Golden Laurel Award
 The Towering Inferno (1974)
 Academy Award for Best Cinematography
 A.S.C. Lifetime Achievement Award (2005)

References 

 Daily Variety, Peripheral Vision: Wide Range of Koenekamp's Work Underscores his Versatility. November 29, 2016.
 American Cinematographer. A Versatile Veteran. November 29, 2016.]* American Cinematographer. ASC frames Koenekamp for lifetime achievement
 Academy Awards Database
 Index for Motion Picture Credits

1922 births
2017 deaths
American cinematographers
United States Navy personnel of World War II
Best Cinematographer Academy Award winners
People from Los Angeles